The 1961 Utah Redskins football team was an American football team that represented the University of Utah as a member of the Skyline Conference during the 1961 NCAA University Division football season. In their fourth season under head coach Ray Nagel, the Redskins compiled an overall record of 6–4 with a mark of 3–3 against conference opponents, tying for third place in the Skyline. Home games were played on campus at Ute Stadium in Salt Lake City.

Utah did not face longtime rival Colorado in the previous two years. This season the Redskins upset the No. 8 Buffaloes at Folsom Field in Boulder, Colorado, Utah's first win in the rivalry since 1948. After 1962, the series went on hiatus until 2011, when both schools joined the Pac-12 Conference.

Schedule

NFL Draft
One Utah player was selected in the 1962 NFL Draft.

References

Utah
Utah Utes football seasons
Utah Redskins football